Circle of Deceit may refer to:

 Circle of Deceit (1981 film), German film
 Circle of Deceit (1998 film), American TV film
 Circles of Deceit, British television thriller series